The Norwegian Petroleum Directorate or OD is a Norwegian government agency responsible for the regulation of the petroleum resources on the Norwegian continental shelf. Based in Stavanger, its mission is to ensure that the petroleum resources are allocated in an optimal way, at the same time incurring minimal environmental impact. It is subordinate to the Norwegian Ministry of Petroleum and Energy.

History
The agency was created by Storting on July 14, 1972 with the responsibility of managing the petroleum resources. It was originally part of the Ministry of Industry, but became part of the Ministry of Petroleum and Energy when it was created in 1978. From January 1, 2004 the division related to labour and safety issues was made a separate agency, the Petroleum Safety Authority Norway, that became part of the Ministry of Labour and Social Inclusion. From the establishment in 1972 until 1997 the agency was led by Fredrik Hagemann, from then until 2007 by Gunnar Berge, when Bente Nyland took over.

References

Ministry of Petroleum and Energy
Government agencies of Norway
Petroleum in Norway
Government agencies established in 1972